Helicopter Sea Combat Squadron 22 (HSC-22) is a United States Navy helicopter squadron based at NAS Chambers Field (KNGU) in Norfolk, Virginia.  The "Sea Knights" were Established on September 29, 2006, and have multiple missions including vertical replenishment, search and rescue, air-sea rescue and anti-surface warfare. The Sea Knights fly the MH-60S helicopter, manufactured by Sikorsky Aircraft in Stratford, Connecticut.  It is the first new helicopter squadron at Naval Station Norfolk in 22 years. HSC-22 is the sister squadron of HSC-23 "Wild Cards" stationed at Naval Air Station North Island in Coronado, California.

Command emblem 
The Knight's helmet symbolizes the American warrior prepared for battle. The crossed tridents symbolize the sea combat capabilities of our helicopter in the maritime environment. The quartered shield represents a stout defense, strength, protection and invulnerability. The black stands for constancy, steadfastness, and fidelity while the silver and white stand for peace and sincerity. Together the three colors symbolize an undying resolution to protect the key tenets of freedom.

References

External links
HSC-22 Official Command Website
Navy Newsstand Article

See also
 History of the United States Navy
 List of United States Navy aircraft squadrons

Helicopter sea combat squadrons of the United States Navy
Military units and formations in Virginia